Marcus Tupuola (born 5 October 1995) is an American rugby union player, currently playing for Major League Rugby side San Diego Legion. His preferred position is wing.
Tupuola played for Major League Rugby side San Diego Legion in the 2019 Major League Rugby season. 

Tupuola grew up in Carson, California, where he attended Carson High School. He attended university at Norte Dame College.

National team
Tupuola also represents the United States national rugby sevens team where he plays fly-half. He debuted for the US Sevens team in 2019. He represented the U.S. in Rugby sevens at the 2019 Pan American Games.

References

External links
itsrugby.co.uk Profile

1995 births
Living people
American rugby union players
Rugby union wings
Pan American Games medalists in rugby sevens
Pan American Games bronze medalists for the United States
Rugby sevens players at the 2019 Pan American Games
Medalists at the 2019 Pan American Games
San Diego Legion players